Flamme may refer to:
Flammé (yarn), a kind of novelty yarn
Flammé (vexillology) (German geflammt), flag design that places a coat of arms in the center of the flag, filling the remaining space on the flag with flame-like designs

People
August Flamme (1884–1961), Canadian provincial politician from Alberta, Canada
Michel Flamme, French head chef

Film and TV
Die Flamme, original German title of the 1923 film The Flame directed by Ernst Lubitsch

Others
Flammen (Schreker), opera on the Don Juan story
Flammen (Schulhoff), opera on a medieval legend
Flammes, 2002 compilation recorded by French pop act Niagara
"Flamme" (song), a 1999 tropical song by Slaï, French singer of Guadeloupe origin

See also
Feuer und Flamme, German artist Nena's fourth album
Fer et Flamme, graphical adventure game for the Amstrad CPC
"Vers la flamme" (literally "Toward the flame"), Alexander Scriabin music piece for piano, written in 1914
Union of Communist Struggles – The Flame, in French: Union des Luttes Communistes - La Flamme, a Burkina Faso political party (also party organ La Flamme)
Flame (disambiguation)